Hotel Rose, formerly operating as the Riverside West Motor Hotel and Hotel Fifty, is a 140-room boutique hotel in southwest Portland, Oregon.

Description 
The 140-room boutique hotel is located in the downtown Portland, across from Tom McCall Waterfront Park.

History 
The  Riverside West Motor Hotel opened in 1964.

In 2013, Bellevue, Washington-based Pineapple Hospitality acquired Hotel Fifty from Oly-IDA Hotels LLC, a joint venture between Coastal Hotel Group, IDA Riverfront LLC, and an Olympic Investors LLC affiliate. The hotel was rebranded as Hotel Rose. The lobby restaurant H5O Bistro was rebranded as the gastropub Bottle + Kitchen in June 2014.

Fifty-two hotel and Bottle + Kitchen restaurant employees were laid off temporarily because of the COVID-19 pandemic.

References 

1964 establishments in Oregon
Hotel buildings completed in 1964
Hotels in Portland, Oregon
Southwest Portland, Oregon